Alfredo Chavez Marquez (June 30, 1922 – August 27, 2014) was a United States district judge of the United States District Court for the District of Arizona.

Education and career

Born in Winkelman, Arizona, Marquez was an Ensign in the United States Navy during World War II, from 1942 to 1945. He then received a Bachelor of Arts degree from University of Arizona in 1948, and a Bachelor of Laws from the James E. Rogers College of Law at the University of Arizona in 1950. He was in private practice in Phoenix, Arizona from 1950 to 1951, and was an assistant state attorney general of Arizona from 1951 to 1952, and deputy county attorney of Pima County, Arizona from 1952 to 1954. He was an administrative assistant for United States Representative Stewart Udall in 1955. He was a prosecutor for the City of Tucson, Arizona from 1956 to 1957. He was then in private practice of law in Tucson from 1956 to 1980.

Federal judicial service

On June 2, 1980, Marquez was nominated by President Jimmy Carter to a new seat on the United States District Court for the District of Arizona created by 92 Stat. 1629. Marquez was confirmed by the United States Senate on June 26, 1980, and received his commission on June 30, 1980. He assumed senior status on July 25, 1991. His seat was filled via the appointment of Judge John Roll. He died on August 27, 2014, in Tucson.

See also
List of Hispanic/Latino American jurists

References

Sources
 
Political Graveyard
Arizona Daily Star Obituary

1922 births
2014 deaths
Lawyers from Tucson, Arizona
People from Winkelman, Arizona
Military personnel from Arizona
Judges of the United States District Court for the District of Arizona
United States district court judges appointed by Jimmy Carter
20th-century American judges
United States Navy officers
University of Arizona alumni
James E. Rogers College of Law alumni
Hispanic and Latino American judges